Hiram W. Ricker Sr. (September 5, 1857 - November 19, 1930) was an American hotelier from Maine. Ricker was a founder of the Poland Spring Resort in Poland, Maine.

References

1857 births
1930 deaths
Businesspeople from Maine
People from Poland, Maine
American hoteliers